Elections to Tendring District Council took place on 1 May 2003. This was on the same day as other local elections across the United Kingdom.

Summary Result

Ward results

CRP = Community Representative Party

Alresford

Alton Park

Ardleigh & Little Bromley

Beaumont & Thorpe

Bockings Elm

Bradfield, Wrabness & Wix

Brightlingsea

Burrsville

Frinton

Golf Green

Great & Little Oakley

Great Bentley

Hamford

Harwich East

Harwich East Central

Harwich West

Harwich West Central

Haven

Holland & Kirby

Homelands

Lawford

Little Clacton & Weeley

Manningtree, Mistley, Little Bentley & Tendring

Peter Bruff

Pier

Ramsey & Parkeston

Rush Green

St. Bartholomew's

St. James

St. John's

St. Mary's

St. Osyth & Point Clear

St. Paul's

Thorrington, Frating, Elmstead & Great Bromley

Walton

References

2003
2003 English local elections